Dizzy – The Ultimate Cartoon Adventure is an adventure-platform game, the first video game featuring the character Dizzy, an anthropomorphic egg. The game was designed by two British brothers, the Oliver Twins. Dizzy was published by Codemasters and was released in June 1987.

Gameplay

The game is a platform adventure where Dizzy must search the fairy tale land of Katmandu for a Leprechaun's Wig, a Cloud's Silver Lining, a Vampire Dux Feather, and a Troll Brew and deposit them in a cauldron to make a potion to defeat the evil wizard Zaks. The gameplay involves collecting items and moving to other locations where the item is required; for example, at one point a raincoat is needed to protect against damaging rain. This is made more difficult because only one item can be carried at any given time. The game includes several lines from J. Milton Hayes' poem The Green Eye of the Yellow God on banners in certain screens, where they serve as clues on how to solve some puzzles.

Unlike later games in the series, which focus more on the inventory-based puzzles, this game features a very large number of hazards that kill the player on contact. With only three lives initially to complete the game, this made the game challenging to complete.

Development
The Oliver Twins said in an interview, on the British television show When Games Attack, that the character Dizzy was originally not supposed to be an egg at all but just a face with hands and feet. They then said they accepted everyone thought he was an egg and decided to go with that. They also said they used to plan out levels on the back of spare rolls of wallpaper.

Dizzy gets his name from the character's tumbles and somersaults while jumping, a feature inspired by the Oliver Twins' graphics software Panda Sprites which enabled them to rotate an image easily so each frame did not have to be manually drawn. The software distorted complex sprites so the character was required to be simple, hence the choice of an egg.

Reception

The ZX Spectrum version was voted the 5th best game of all time for Sinclair computers in a special issue of Your Sinclair magazine in 2004. In 2017, the game was placed on Eurogamer's "10 games that defined the ZX Spectrum" list.

References

External links 

The Oliver Twins website 

1987 video games
Amiga games
Amstrad CPC games
Codemasters games
Commodore 64 games
Dizzy (series)
Europe-exclusive video games
Video games scored by David Whittaker
ZX Spectrum games
Video games developed in the United Kingdom